NASPA may refer to:

National Association of Student Personnel Administrators
NASPA Games, a games organization formerly known as North American Scrabble Players Association